Sharafabad-e Bala (also Romanized as Sharafābād-e Bālā; also known as Sharafābād) is a village in Kakavand-e Gharbi Rural District, Kakavand District, Delfan County, Lorestan Province, Iran. At the 2006 census, its population was 313, in 56 families.

References 

Towns and villages in Delfan County